Timité Bassori (born 30 December 1933) is an Ivorian filmmaker, actor, and writer. His lone feature-length film, The Woman with the Knife (1969), is considered a classic of African cinema, and is slated to be restored as part of the African Film Heritage Project, an initiative to preserve 50 African films through the collaboration of the groups FEPACI, UNESCO, Cineteca di Bologna, and Martin Scorsese's The Film Foundation. The film is earmarked to be shown along with 4 other restored films at the 2019 film festival FESPACO.

Biography 
Timité Bassori is one of the pioneers of Ivorian cinema.
Of Mandé-Dioula origin, he was born on December 30, 1933, in Aboisso in the extreme south-east of Côte d'Ivoire; After attending elementary school there. in 1949, he entered the Technical College of Abidjan, commercial section. he completed his studies in 1952 and worked in various commercial establishments.
Wanting to do theater, he left for PARIS; first at SIMON courses from 1956 to 1957 then at the Center d'Art Dramatique on rue Blanche from 1957 to 1958.
President of the Compagnie d'Art Dramatique des GRIOTS, which he founded in 1957 with student friends.

Filmography

As director
The Foresters (documentary; 1963)
Abidjan-Niger (documentary; 1963)
Amédée Pierre (documentary; 1963)
On the Dune of Solitude (1964)
The Sixth Furrow (1966)
Bush Fires (1967)
The Woman with the Knife (1969)
Abidjan, the Lagoon Pearl (1971)
Bondoukou, Year 11 (1971)
Odienné, Year 12 (1972)
Kossou 1 (1972)
Kossou 2 (1974)
The Akati Fellows (1974)

As producer
The Woman with the Knife (1969)
Black and White in Color (1976)
Weeds (1978)

As assistant director
Man from Cocody (1965)

Notes

References

1933 births
Ivorian film directors
Ivorian novelists
Living people
People of French West Africa